In Greek mythology, Cychreus (Ancient Greek: Κυχρεύς) was the son of Poseidon and Salamis, daughter of the river god Asopus.

Family 
By the nymph Stilbe, Cychreus became the father of Chariclo, Chiron's wife. One of his daughters, Glauce, married Telamon who later inherited Cychreus' kingdom after his wife died.

Mythology
According to numerous sources, Cychreus either:

 Fought a dragon/serpent (Cychreides) that was terrorizing the island of Salamis, and upon slaying it was made king.
 Raised a dragon/serpent (Cychreides) as a pet, before he became ruler of Salamis. It went on a rampage, and was driven away or captured by Eurylochus, who gave it to Demeter, a goddess who then kept it for her own.
 Was known as "the dragon" for his short tempered nature, and terrorized the island of Salamis  until driven off by Eurylochus, but was received at Eleusis by Demeter, who made him her high priest.

Notes

References
Apollodorus, The Library with an English Translation by Sir James George Frazer, F.B.A., F.R.S. in 2 Volumes, Cambridge, MA, Harvard University Press; London, William Heinemann Ltd. 1921. ISBN 0-674-99135-4. Online version at the Perseus Digital Library. Greek text available from the same website.
 Newman, Harold and Jon O. A Genealogical Chart of Greek Mythology. 2003. Chapel Hill: The University of North Carolina Press
M. Grant and J. Hazel, Who's Who in Greek Mythology, David McKay & Co Inc, 1979
 Stephanus of Byzantium, Stephani Byzantii Ethnicorum quae supersunt, edited by August Meineike (1790-1870), published 1849. A few entries from this important ancient handbook of place names have been translated by Brady Kiesling. Online version at the Topos Text Project.
 Strabo, The Geography of Strabo. Edition by H.L. Jones. Cambridge, Mass.: Harvard University Press; London: William Heinemann, Ltd. 1924. Online version at the Perseus Digital Library.
 Strabo, Geographica edited by A. Meineke. Leipzig: Teubner. 1877. Greek text available at the Perseus Digital Library.

Kings in Greek mythology
Children of Poseidon
Demigods in classical mythology
Salaminian characters in Greek mythology